Gustav Granath (born 15 February 1997) is a Swedish football defender who plays for Degerfors IF.

References

1997 births
Living people
Swedish footballers
Association football defenders
Skövde AIK players
Degerfors IF players
Ettan Fotboll players
Superettan players
Allsvenskan players